Zai Shijie Zhongxin is the second album by Singaporean singer Kelly Poon, and her first to be released in Taiwan. It was released on September 28, 2007.

Track listing 
 It's Not Ending
 完美的默契 (Perfect Chemistry)
 溺愛 (Spoiled)
 再聯絡 (Get In Touch Again)
 Flying
 在世界中心 (In the Heart of the World)
 Shakalaka Baby (music by A. R. Rahman)
 第二生命 (Second Life)
 Action
 一秒鐘的永遠 (One Second of Eternity)
 印象派的愛情 (Impressionistic Love)
 Message
 給前男友 (To My Ex-Boyfriend)
 LIVE
 別說我購物狂 (Don't Say I'm a Shopaholic)

References

Kelly Poon albums
2007 albums